Vancouver Animation School is a fully accredited online school offering entry and advanced programs for the Animation, Visual Effects and Video Game industries. VANAS offers vocational Certificates, Diplomas and university pathways in a variety of art and technology, media and design fields. The main campus of Vancouver Animation School is located in Vancouver, British Columbia, Canada on Granville Island. Programs are delivered entirely online via their proprietary online campus called "Edutisse", enabling a diverse faculty and student body to interact with one another from anywhere in the world.

History 
Vancouver Animation School was founded and registered in December 2010. At the time, it was the only exclusively online school applying for registration. In July 2013, It became the first exclusively online animation school to be fully accredited by the Private Career Training Institutions Agency.  Shortly after in August 2013, it received designation from the British Columbia Education Quality Assurance (BCEQA).

Accreditation and licensure

State licensure 
In August 2013, Vancouver Animation School received designation from the British Columbia Education Quality Assurance, where the Ministry of Advanced Education is responsible for establishing the EQA designation policy, which includes setting acceptable quality assurance standards.

Degree programs 
In July 2015, Vancouver Animation School and Universidad Iberoamericana Puebla entered into a partnership bridging Mexico and Canada educational sectors, delivering a joint program in Entertainment Design consisting of a hybrid education using online and on-site models of delivery. Mexican students receive education from both institutions and dual academic credentials from both countries.

Other authorizations 
Vancouver Animation School researches and initiates its programs in consultations with studios from the Animation, Visual Effects and Video Game industries.  Consultations allow the studios to perform community outreach through the school, and to provide up-to-date information from the industry to be implemented in its educational curriculum.

References 
 VANAS Fully Accredited, Animation World Network
 VANAS recognized by B.C. accrediting body, Playblack
 VANAS online school brings together talent and opportunity
 Vancouver Animation School establishes degree pathway with Emily Carr University of Art + Design, Vancouver Economic Commission

External links 
 Vancouver Animation School website

Art schools in Canada
Distance education institutions based in Canada
Educational institutions established in 2010
Animation schools in Canada
Universities and colleges in Vancouver
Colleges in British Columbia
Video game universities
2010 establishments in British Columbia